Anembo is a locality in the Snowy Monaro Region, New South Wales, Australia. It lies south of Captains Flat and northeast of Bredbo. It had a public school from 1868 to 1942, often operating "half-time" or "house to house".

References

Snowy Monaro Regional Council
Localities in New South Wales
Southern Tablelands